Mzhezh or Mjej Gnuni (Mžēž Gnuni),  was an Armenian sparapet of Byzantine Armenia.

Initially serving under Heraclius, the contingent of Armenian troops under his command were instrumental in the Byzantine success against the Sassanids during the Byzantine-Persian Wars that culminated in the overthrow of Khosrau II in 628. He also served as the sparapet (commander in chief) of Byzantine Armenia from about 630 to 638, and during this time may have been responsible for the founding of the Cathedral of Mren. He was succeeded in this position by David Saharuni, from the middle-ranking Armenian nobility, after being accused of plotting against the life of Heraclius. While being sent into exile he escaped and made his way back to Armenia. There he raised an army, but David Saharuni defeated and then slew Mjej Gnuni and, by uniting various local princes, declared himself ruler of Armenia. Faced with such a fait acompli, and recognizing Armenia's strategic importance, in 638 Heraclius confirmed David in his position and awarded him the titles of curopalate, sparapet, and prince of Armenia and Syria.

He is also known to have approached the Armenian Catholicos Ezra for a union of the Armenian and Greek Churches, who initially refused, but later yielded to the menaces of the general.

References 

Byzantine people of Armenian descent
Byzantine generals
Medieval Armenian generals
7th-century Byzantine people
7th-century rulers in Asia
Byzantine governors
7th-century Armenian people
Gnuni family
People of the Roman–Sasanian Wars